Barry John Thomas (born 29 October 1951, Harrow, Middlesex) is a former motorcycle speedway rider. 'Thommo' is considered to be the most popular Hackney rider ever, staying with the club based at the Hackney Wick Stadium for a record-breaking 20 consecutive seasons.

Career
Although originally preferring Junior Grasstrack, Thommo was first spotted during interval demonstration rides at the home of the West Ham Hammers with friend and rival Dave Jessup, following which he signed for the Canterbury Crusaders. He progressed through to heat leader status in his very first season, prompting Hackney Hawks promoter Len Silver to buy him for the Hawks in 1970.

He was given plenty of advice and help from Garry Middleton who helped him with any bike problems he had which resulted in him winning the British Junior Championship in that first season at Hackney.

He also twice won the prestigious London Riders Championship in 1973 and 1974 and became a regular representing his country in the test matches.

He became Hackney Captain in 1975 and played a huge part in the signing of Polish Champion Zenon Plech.

Although he never fulfilled his early potential to become one of the world's best riders, mostly notably never reaching a world final, he became a successful British League heat leader thrilling fans around the country with his exciting never say die racing style which saw most of his points scored by overtaking opposing riders after his characteristic poor start . He was awarded a testimonial for 10 years service in 1979.

In 1981, after a couple of poor seasons, he dropped into the National League with the Crayford Kestrels but continued his Hackney career as reserve. However, in 1984 Crayford were forced to close and the promotion moved the team to Hackney to compete in the National League as the Hackney Kestrels and Thommo returned full-time to Hackney again as captain.

In 1989 he was awarded a record-breaking second testimonial, being the only rider to ever spend 20 consecutive years at one speedway club.

He has since made one or two special appearances; most notably in 2001 he made a special one-off appearance for a Hackney team in a meeting at Rye House, having never ridden a bike for thirteen years and after a further 10 years won a veteran speedway event at Lydd speedway in 2011.

External links
www.hackneyhawks.co.uk

References

1951 births
Living people
British speedway riders
English motorcycle racers
People from Harrow, London
Hackney Hawks riders
Crayford Kestrels riders
Rye House Rockets riders
Canterbury Crusaders riders